Ignatius Isaac II was the Patriarch of Antioch and head of the Syriac Orthodox Church from 1709 until his resignation in 1723.

Biography
Isaac ʿAzar was born at Mosul in 1647, and was the son of Maqdisi 'Azar and Maryam. He had brothers named Matthew and Jacob, and two uncles, George and Rizq Allah, through his mother. Isaac became a monk at the nearby monastery of Saint Matthew, where he and his uncle George were both ordained as priests in 1669 by Basil Yeldo, Maphrian of the East. In 1673, Isaac and George aided Basil Yeldo in renovating the monastery of Saint Matthew, for which the three of them were imprisoned by the governor of Mosul for a short while. Basil Yeldo appointed Isaac as the abbot of the monastery of Saint Matthew in 1675, and he was later ordained as archbishop of the monastery of Saint Matthew by Patriarch Ignatius Abdulmasih I in early 1684 at the monastery of Saint Ananias, upon which he assumed the name Severus. This took place at the same time as George's ordination as Basil Yeldo's successor as Maphrian of the East.

In April 1687, Isaac was ordained as Maphrian of the East at the Great Church of Mardin by his uncle George, who had been elevated to patriarch of Antioch at the same time, upon which he assumed the name Basil. Throughout George's tenure as patriarch, Isaac was entrusted with the administration of the whole church, and thus he ordained several bishops and a number of presbyters, deacons and monks. At Amida, he rebuilt the church of Saint Jacob in 1691, and renovated the church of Saint Mary in 1693, and added the nave of Saint Jacob of Serugh, on instruction from the patriarch. In 1701, he received permission from the Ottoman government to rebuild the churches of Mardin after having travelled to Constantinople and other places, accompanied by the priest Shukrallah. 

Whilst Isaac was at Aleppo, George died on 5 June 1708. A synod was subsequently held at the monastery of Saint Ananias in 1709, with Maphrian Basil Lazarus of Tur Abdin presiding, and Isaac was unanimously chosen to succeed George as patriarch of Antioch. After having received a firman from the Ottoman government recognising his ascension to the patriarchal office, Isaac was consecrated as patriarch by Basil Lazarus at Amida on 8 February 1709, upon which he assumed the name Ignatius. Isaac served as patriarch until ill health led him to resign, and, as a result, a synod was convened at the monastery of Saint Ananias on 20 July 1723, at which Dionysius Shukrallah, archbishop of Aleppo, was elected as patriarch with Isaac's approval. Isaac returned to Mosul, where he died on 11 or 18 July 1724, and was buried in his father's mausoleum at the Church of Saint Thomas. As maphrian and patriarch, Isaac ordained seventeen bishops.

Works
At the time of the reconstruction of the church of Saint Jacob at Amida in 1691, Isaac issued a decree on behalf of the Shamsis, a small former sun-worshipping sect that had joined the Syriac Orthodox Church yet faced suspicion, to attest to their adherence to the Church. The decree was a copy of a document written by the monk David of Homs in c. 1460; it was later found by Patriarch Ignatius George V in 1825 and copied again in Garshuni.

He also composed a short grammar book in Syriac in 15 chapters on etymology and morphology whilst maphrian, before 1699.

Episcopal succession
As maphrian and patriarch, Isaac ordained the following bishops:

Dioscorus Shukr Allah, archbishop of Gazarta (1687)
Timothy Shukr Allah, archbishop of Amida (1690)
Severus Malke, archbishop of the monastery of Saint Matthew (1694)
Athanasius Murad, archbishop of Gazarta (1695)
Timothy ‘Ata Allah, bishop of Edessa (1699)
Dionysius Shukr Allah, archbishop of Aleppo (1709)
Basil Lazarus III, Maphrian of the East (1709)
Basil Simon II, Maphrian of Tur Abdin (1710)
John of Mardin, archbishop of the monastery of Saint Abhai, Gargar, and Ḥisn Manṣūr (1712)
Basil Matthew II, Maphrian of the East (1713)
Gregorius Job, archbishop of the monastery of Saint Abhai (1714)
Timothy ’Isa, archbishop of monastery of Saint Ananias and Mardin (1718)
Severus Elias, archbishop of Edessa (1718)
Dioscorus Aho, archbishop of Gazarta (1718)
Gregorius ‘Abd al-Ahad, archbishop of Jerusalem (1719)
Iyawannis Karas, archbishop of the monastery of Saint Behnam (1722)
Basil George, archbishop (1722)

References
Notes

Citations

Bibliography

People from Mosul
Syriac Patriarchs of Antioch from 512 to 1783
1647 births
1724 deaths
Assyrians from the Ottoman Empire
18th-century Oriental Orthodox archbishops
17th-century Oriental Orthodox archbishops
Maphrians
Prisoners and detainees of the Ottoman Empire
Syriac writers
Oriental Orthodox bishops in the Ottoman Empire
18th-century writers from the Ottoman Empire
17th-century writers from the Ottoman Empire